Fading Frontier is the seventh studio album by the American indie rock band Deerhunter, released on October 16, 2015 on 4AD. Produced by Ben H. Allen, who had previously worked with the band on Halcyon Digest (2010), and the band itself, the album was preceded by the singles "Snakeskin", "Breaker" and "Living My Life".

Background
In December 2014, Bradford Cox was involved in a car crash which left him "seriously injured, but also provided a perspective-giving jolt". Prior to the release of Fading Frontier, Cox stated that the accident "erased all illusions" and admitted that it was a definite turning point for him. Fading Frontier is Deerhunter's and Cox's first release since the accident. This album saw the departure of Frankie Broyles, who left the band in 2015 to focus on his solo career. The song "Ad Astra" contains a sample from Bascom Lamar Lunsford's "I Wish I Was a Mole in the Ground."

Release and promotion

Fading Frontier was announced via a countdown timer on Deerhunter's website, which ended on 16 August 2015.

The first single released was "Snakeskin" on August 17, followed up with "Breaker" on September 15, of which the video was directed by Cox himself.

The cover art for the album is a photograph titled "Zuma" by the artist John Divola.

Critical reception

At Metacritic, which assigns a normalized rating out of 100 to reviews from mainstream critics, the album has received an average score of 81, based on 27 reviews, indicating "universal acclaim."

Consequence of Sound critic Sheldon Pearce wrote that the album is "one more gem from a well-traveled band that’s still finding new territory to explore." NME critic Barry Nicholson praised the record and gave it a perfect score, describing it as "a remarkable album, one that only grows more awesome with each listen." Ian Cohen of Pitchfork awarded the album with a "Best New Music" tag and wrote: "If there isn't a Deerhunter sound, there's a Deerhunter perspective that runs through their work, best summed up in 'All the Same'—'take your handicaps/ Channel them and feed them back/ Until they become your strengths.' The weird era continues." In The Guardian, Alex Petridis noted the album's more mainstream sound: "there are so many straightforwardly commercial-sounding songs here," he observed, "that Fading Frontier could conceivably be an album that turns Deerhunter from cult concern into mainstream success." Citing a lack of angst and urgency in comparison to previous efforts, Exclaim!'''s Anna Alger wrote that "On Fading Frontier, Deerhunter focus on their ability as a band to hypnotize and confound, which make the explosive moments here stand out that much more."

In a less favorable review, Clash critic Sam Walker-Smart wrote that the record "is by no means a poor album, and truth be told really doesn't possess a bad number on it." Nevertheless, he added: "When the oddities on this album ride so high they should have let complete weirdness take over."

Accolades

Track listing

 The last thirty seconds of Ad Astra is Bradford Cox performing the traditional folk song I Wish I Was a Mole in the Ground.

Personnel
Credits for the album were adapted from a press release by 4AD''.

Deerhunter
 Bradford Cox – lead vocals, guitar, percussion, keyboards, electronics
 Lockett Pundt – guitar, co-lead vocals (3), lead vocals (8), keyboards
 Moses Archuleta – drums, percussion, electronics
 Josh McKay – bass guitar, organ

Additional musicians
 Tim Gane – electronic harpsichord (4)
 James Cargill – synthesizers, tapes (5)
 Zumi Rosow – treated alto saxophone (7)

Charts

References

External links
 "Deerhunter" on 4AD Records

2015 albums
Deerhunter albums
4AD albums
Albums produced by Ben H. Allen